The Dømmesmo Oak (in Norwegian: Dømmesmoeika) is a large oak tree that stands at Dømmesmoen park in Grimstad, Norway. A heavy snowfall in March 1985 broke several of the largest branches, and a New Year fireworks rocket ignited the tree around the year 2000. Nevertheless, the tree is still one of the most distinctive of old Norwegian trees. The oak is hollow, but the foliage is still lush and vigorous. Estimated age is about 500 years.

The Dømmesmo Oak is probably a hybrid of the oak tree species Quercus robur and Quercus petraea.

The cavity is formed by Laetiporus sulphureus.

The legend 
A legend tells that the master thief Gjest Baardsen escaped the law enforcement authorities on one occasion by hiding inside the hollow Dømmesmo Oak.

References 

Grimstad
Tourist attractions in Agder
Individual trees in Norway
Individual oak trees